Mitogen-activated protein kinase 9 is an enzyme that in humans is encoded by the MAPK9 gene.

Function 

The protein encoded by this gene is a member of the MAP kinase family. MAP kinases act as an integration point for multiple biochemical signals, and are involved in a wide variety of cellular processes such as proliferation, differentiation, transcription regulation and development. This kinase targets specific transcription factors, and thus mediates immediate-early gene expression in response to various cell stimuli. It is most closely related to MAPK8, both of which are involved in UV radiation-induced apoptosis, thought to be related to the cytochrome c-mediated cell death pathway. This gene and MAPK8 are also known as c-Jun  N-terminal kinases. This kinase blocks the ubiquitination of tumor suppressor p53, and thus it increases the stability of p53 in nonstressed cells. Studies of this gene's mouse counterpart suggest a key role in T-cell differentiation. Four alternatively spliced transcript variants encoding distinct isoforms have been reported.

Interactions 

Mitogen-activated protein kinase 9 has been shown to interact with:
 Grb2, 
 MAPK8IP1,
 MAPK8IP2, 
 MAPK8IP3 
 P53,  and
 TOB1.

References

Further reading

External links 
 MAP Kinase Resource  .

EC 2.7.11
Human proteins